Belgrade Security Forum (Serbian: Београдски безбедносни форум; abbreviation: BSF) is  an international conference organized usually in September or October in Belgrade and brings together representatives of governments, academia and the non-governmental sector. Conference is jointly organized by the Belgrade Fund for Political Excellence, Belgrade Centre for Security Policy and European Movement in Serbia.

History and Mission 
The conference was launched in 2011 by the Belgrade Fund for Political Excellence, the Belgrade Centre for Security Policy and the European Movement in Serbia. The idea of the forum is to bring together all relevant stakeholders from the public administration, academia and the non-governmental sector of the Western Balkans, to exchange views and contribute to addressing ongoing issues in the region.

The key values and mission of the initiative is the following:
Europe as a community of values, with a stronger foreign and security policy;
The Balkans (South East Europe) as an actor and subject of global debates;
Nurturing the greater and mutual instead of particular interests;
Democratization of “high politics” by insisting on a culture of an inclusive dialogue;
Debates that are topical and insightful;
Autonomous, made by three civil society organizations.

Editions of the forum

Structure and time of the event 
The forum is usually organized every year in September or October in Hotel Hyatt Belgrade. The even usually has several panels, round tables and presentations various halls. There is also academic event that precedes the main event. with speakers.

Prizes and recognition 
2015 PASOS Think-Tank Achievement of the Year Award, which is awarded for 2014 edition of the forum by The Policy Association for an Open Society.

References

External links 
 Official web page

Events in Belgrade
International conferences